Józef Pawlikowski (1767 near Piotrków – 1828 in Warsaw) was a Polish noble (from an impoverished noble family) and political activist. One of the Polish Jacobins; secretary of Tadeusz Kościuszko in 1795 in France. An independence activist in Congress Poland, he was arrested in 1826 and died in prison in 1828.

1767 births
1828 deaths
Polish Jacobins